The following lists events in the year 2014 in Turkey.

Incumbents
President: Abdullah Gül (until 28 August), Recep Tayyip Erdoğan (starting 28 August)
Prime Minister: Recep Tayyip Erdoğan (until 28 August), Ahmet Davutoğlu (starting 28 August)

Events

January
 3 January – Turkish lira falls on world currency markets following moves by Central Bank to halt capital flight and strong criticism by Prime Minister Erdogan.
 20 January – Two car bombs kill at least 16 people in an attack on a border post on the Turkish-Syrian border.
 28 January – Turkish lira and other emerging market currencies fall further, despite doubling of interest rate by Central Bank.

February
 7 February – A plane is forced to land in Turkey following a bomb threat from a passenger on board a flight from Kharkov in Ukraine. 
 9 February – Tear gas and water cannons used by the Erdoğan government against street protests against his government's internet restrictions.
 10 February – Stalled negotiations over Cyprus resume between Turkish and Greek governments.

May
 13 May – an underground coal fire at a mine in Soma, Manisa, killing 301 people.
 24 May – The 6.9  Aegean Sea earthquake shook the area with a maximum Mercalli intensity of VIII (Severe). Three hundred and twenty-four were injured.

June
 8 June – Turkey starts work on huge Istanbul Airport.

Aug

 10 Aug – Turkey's Premier Is Proclaimed Winner of 2014 Turkish presidential election. Erdoğan's presidential win.

October
10 October – 36 killed during mass protests across Turkey in protests over Ankara's policies towards the ISIL.

November
 1 November – Turkey breaks from its policy of preventing Kurdish fighters from entering Syria and allows 150 Iraqi Peshmerga to cross into Kobani.
 3 November – A small boat carrying asylum seekers sinks in the Black Sea near Istanbul resulting in at least 21 deaths.
 28 November – Pope Francis visits Turkey, calling for interfaith dialogue and an end to Islamic extremism, and meeting with President Recep Tayyip Erdoğan and Bartholomew I of Constantinople.

December
 1 December – Russia abandons its plans for the South Stream pipeline to Bulgaria due to European Union objections instead looking at a pipeline to Turkey.

Deaths
 8 January – Selçuk Uluergüven, 73, actor.
 22 February – Behsat Üvez, 53, singer-songwriter (lung cancer)
 11 March – Berkin Elvan, 15, student.
 20 June – Murat Sökmenoğlu, 69, politician

See also
2014 in Turkish television
List of Turkish films of 2014

References

 
2010s in Turkey
Years of the 21st century in Turkey
Turkey
Turkey
Turkey